The Li Ka Shing Foundation is a Hong Kong-based charitable organization founded in 1980 by Hong Kong entrepreneur Li Ka-shing.

The Third Son 
Li Ka-shing considers the Li Ka Shing Foundation to be his "third son" and has pledged to donate one-third of his assets to support philanthropic projects. He has called for other Asian entrepreneurs to do the same, in the hope of altering the traditional notion of passing wealth through lineage.

The Li Ka Shing Foundation's story stretches back over three decades: Having grown up as a witness to suffering and illness, Li Ka-shing cultivated a compassion that set in motion the idea of establishing a charitable foundation.

Mission 
Li Ka Shing Foundation supports projects that promote social progress through expanding access to quality education and medical services and research, encouraging cultural diversity and community involvement.

Every project and every donation stems from Li Ka-shing's belief in the inherent value of each human life, regardless of race, class, or circumstance. He has devoted himself to helping others overcome the educational and physical barriers preventing them from achieving their potential.

Three main focuses 
 Encourage giving to nurture a new culture of philanthropy in Asia
 Support educational reform to create a paradigm shift that develops positive and sustainable change
 Support medical research and services to create a healthier world

Major contributions 
To date, Li Ka-shing has invested over HK$30 billion in projects covering education, medical services, charity and anti-poverty programmes, with about 80% of the projects in Mainland China and Hong Kong.

Hong Kong

 In 2005, announced a donation of HK$1 billion to Faculty of Medicine of the University of Hong Kong.
 "Love HK Your Way!" campaign launched in 2010, granted over HK$300 million as of September 2013. Thousands of social institutions were involved serving more than 3.3 million people. Major projects include:
 Love Ideas, Love HK (total 3 rounds)
 “Heart of Gold” – Hong Kong Hospice Service Program (10 service centers established)
 Love More
 TrueBeam System donated to the Faculty of Medicine of the Chinese University of Hong Kong & Prince of Wales Hospital
 March of Social Engineers
 In 2013, establishing Tsz Shan Monastery to promote Buddhism.
Opening of the Tsz Shan Monastery Buddhist Art Museum at the Tsz Shan Monastery, which has received over HK$3 billion in funding since 2003 for its development and operations—March 2019. (Long-term project)
In October 2019, the Li Ka Shing Foundation created HK$1 billion Crunch Time Instant Relief Fund to help more than 28,000 small and medium sized enterprises in the food and beverage, retail, and travel sectors, as well as licensed hawkers to weather through hardship.
In 2019 and 2020, the Li Ka Shing Foundation granted over HK$200 million in support of medical and welfare services for Hong Kong.  The “Love Can Help” Medical Assistance Programme offered financial assistance to patients falling outside the social security safety net and ineligible for government subsidies.  “Love Can Help II” expanded support to the social welfare community; non-governmental organizations providing various services to the visually impaired, mentally handicapped and physically disabled, autistic children, elderly and underprivileged families.
In September 2020, Li Ka Shing Foundation has given HK$170 million to four local universities, including the medical faculties of the University of Hong Kong and the Chinese University of Hong Kong, the Hong Kong University of Science and Technology, and the Education University of Hong Kong in support of medical, biological and artificial intelligence research.
In 2020, the Li Ka Shing Foundation has supported the global fight against COVID-19 by sourcing protection gear from around the world and funding medical research and services.  To date, HK$180 million has been used for relief efforts, including making a donation of HK$100 million to support the frontline medics in Wuhan.
In November 2020, donation of HK$5 million for the publication of Hong Kong Chronicles.
In November 2020, HK$3 million emergency relief fund donated to relatives of the victims of Yau Ma Tei fire  and HK$1.5 million to celebrate the centenary of Hong Kong Chiu Chow Chamber of Commerce.
On 24 January 2021, the Li Ka Shing Foundation donated HK$20 million to support Precious Hospital (Caritas)’s Total Knee Replacement programme.
In February 2021, LKSF presented PARKnSHOP coupons worth of HK$200 to all 97,000 Hospital Authority staff to thank them for unwavering commitment and dedication protecting Hong Kong people; a donation of HK$4.1 million was made to support for radiological examination at HKU Li Ka Shing Faculty of Medicine for patients with gastroenterology and liver diseases in Queen Mary Hospital.

Mainland China
 Committing grants and contributions of over HK$12 billion to Shantou University and the Shantou University Medical College since its founding in 1981. Recent commitments include RMB 100 million annually to offer full-tuition academic scholarships for all undergraduate students starting with the incoming class of 2019—June 2019. (Long-term project)
 Annual Funding of RMB 52 million to support the Heart of Gold Nationwide Hospice Service Program, with has received over RMB 800 million in aggregate funding since 2001. (Long-term project)
 Initiated Hospice Service by Shantou Medical College in 1997 and extended to nationwide in 2002. To date, 32 Hospice Service centers are established.
 In 2002, the Cheung Kong Graduate School of Business was established to educate new generation of entrepreneur leaders.
 In 2008, Project New Life for cleft lip and palate surgeries started.
 In 2009, Pediatric Hernia Rehabilitation Program in Western China started.
 In 2010, Project Define – Rural women development was run to enhance women's leadership.
 In 2012, Love Ideas – Women's Project Guangdong started.
 Providing US$2 million in funding scale socio-economic impact through technological disruption and innovation in Zhejiang and Shanghai—February 2019.
 In February 2021, LKSF sponsored Shanghai’s Little Pigeon Dancing Group’s performance of Shanghai style children musical “Xiao Balazi”.
 Through his Foundation, Mr Li Ka-shing donated on 26 July 2021 HK$20 million to the Liaison Office of the Central People’s Government in the HKSAR special account for disaster relief to support Henan Province’s flood relief efforts.

Overseas
 Established the Center for Learning of Stanford University in the US in 2008.
 Supported the establishment of Institute of Virology of University of Alberta in Canada in 2009.
 Center for Biomedical and Health Sciences of UC Berkeley in the US opened in 2011.
 Oxford University "Big Data" Conference was established in 2013.
 In 2013, sponsored US$130 million to create Guangdong Technion-Israel Institute of Technology with the cooperation between Technion – Israel Institute of Technology and Shantou University. The new institute aims to bring a new era of research and innovation in science, engineering, and life science in China.
 In 2013, granted a C$6.6 million donation for student and faculty exchanges between McGill University and Shantou University in China. 
 Offered a grant of $2 million to University of California San Francisco (UCSF) to advance precision medicine and create a partnership between UCSF and Shantou University, also in 2013.
 In 2015, renewed support for Yale Stem Cell Center (YSCC) with a US$1.86 million grant for education and healthcare in 2015.
 Donated total HK$27.6 million to the University of Auckland Campaign For All Our Futures in 2016.
 Donated  US$3 million for cancer research & precision oncology to the University of Melbourne Centre for Cancer Research (UMCCR) in 2017.
 Established The Li Ka Shing Foundation Lord Sandberg Memorial Scholarship for Hong Kong students in memory of Lord Michael Sandberg of Passfield in King's College London (United Kingdom).
 Sponsoring the Future Now excursion to Australia for an experimental education and exchange program—September 2019.
 Contributing US$1 million to support Saildrone's Antarctic circumnavigation, while making the real-time data available to students for next-gen ocean research—January 2019.
 A$4.5 million to the University of Sydney to support Australia's first clinical trial testing CAR T-cell immunotherapy in patients with advanced pancreatic cancer—November 2018.
 Two Li Ka Shing Chair Professors – Professor Michael Houghton at the University of Alberta and Professor Jennifer Doudna at the University of California, Berkeley – have been awarded the 2020 Nobel Prize in Medicine and Chemistry respectively. Mr Li Ka-shing attended virtual celebrations through Zoom, at which both professors presented to him replicas of their Nobel medals.  After learning that Professor Houghton’s two co-investigators, Dr. Qui-Lim Choo and Dr. George Kuo, had shared in the discovery but had not been awarded the Nobel Prize, Mr Li announced that the Li Ka Shing Foundation would honor Dr Choo and Dr Kuo with the same Nobel prize money of US380,000 each to recognize their contributions.

References

External links 
 Li Ka Shing Foundation
 Love Hong Kong Your Way

Medical and health organisations based in Hong Kong
Organizations established in 1980
Educational foundations
Medical and health foundations